Cambridgeport is an unincorporated village in the town of Rockingham, Windham County, Vermont, United States. Cambridgeport has a post office with ZIP code 05141.

References

Unincorporated communities in Windham County, Vermont
Unincorporated communities in Vermont